The Arsenal was an English car manufactured at St Albans, Hertfordshire from 1898 to 1899.  The Bollée-like tricycle was reputed to be 3½hp.  The manufacturer said the car had "practically the control of one of the largest and best-equipped plants of American Automotive Machinery."  The tiller-steered car, which could carry "two or three persons, or four children," cost £59.

See also
 List of car manufacturers of the United Kingdom

References

Veteran vehicles
Defunct motor vehicle manufacturers of England
Companies based in the City and District of St Albans